Aïcha Belarbi (born 1946) is a Moroccan sociologist, women's rights activist and diplomat. She was ambassador to the European Union from 2000 to 2008.

Life
Aïcha Belarbi was born in Salé in 1946. She became an activist in the Association of Women of the Mediterranean Region (AWMR).

From 1998 to 2000 she was Secretary of State of Foreign Affairs in charge of Co-operation. In 2000 she was appointed Ambassador to the European Union.

Works
 (ed.) Couples en question / Azwāj wa-tasāʼulāt, Casablanca: Editions Le Fennec, 1990
 Le salaire de madame, Casablanca: Editions Le Fennec, 1991
 (ed.) Femmes rurales / Nisāh qarawiyāt (Rural women), Casablanca: Editions Le Fennec, 1995

References

Ambassadors of Morocco
Ambassadors of Morocco to the European Union
Moroccan women diplomats
Moroccan sociologists
1946 births
Living people
Moroccan women academics
Women government ministers of Morocco
Moroccan women's rights activists
Moroccan women sociologists
People from Salé
Moroccan women ambassadors
Moroccan women in politics